Akhisar Museum is a museum in Turkey

Akhisar is a populous ilçe (district) in Manisa Province. The museum is in Akhisar at 

The museum building was built in 1933 and it was used as a junior high school up to 1992. Between 1994-2007 it was the teachers' lodge of Akhisar. After a period of restoration it was opened as a museum in 2012.

There are 11 rooms in the two-storey building. In the natural history section, there are some examples of the natural history such as 11-18 million years-old fossils. In archaeology section, ceramics of the 6000–3000 years B.C., Hellenistic ceramics, figurines, oil lamps, steles, gold, silver and glass objects are exhibited. Lyre playing Eros from 500 B.C., stamp of Heracles and various objects from the Roman Empire era are also in this section. In the ethnography section kitchen tools, oil lamps from Ottoman Empire era and weapons are exhibited. A special section is reserved for the almost forgotten professions of Akhisar like tinsmithing and saddle making. The most important of these is the tobacco works, the main source of revenue around Akhisar.

See also
 Gökçeler relief

References

Museums in Manisa Province
2012 establishments in Turkey
Museums established in 2012
Akhisar District